Neoprotoparmelia fuscosorediata is a species of crustose lichen in the family Parmeliaceae. Found in Kenya, it was described as a new species in 2021 by lichenologists Klaus Kalb and André Aptroot. The specific epithet fuscosorediata refers to the colour of the soredia, which are pale brown to pale ochraceous.

References

fuscosorediata
Lichen species
Lichens described in 2021
Lichens of Kenya
Taxa named by André Aptroot
Taxa named by Klaus Kalb